The Johns Hopkins Hospital (JHH) is the teaching hospital and biomedical research facility of the Johns Hopkins School of Medicine, located in Baltimore, Maryland, U.S. It was founded in 1889 using money from a bequest of over $7 million  (1873 money, worth 163.9 million dollars in 2021) by city merchant, banker/financier, civic leader and philanthropist Johns Hopkins (1795–1873). Johns Hopkins Hospital and its School of Medicine are considered to be the founding institutions of modern American medicine and the birthplace of numerous famous medical traditions including rounds, residents and house staff. Many medical specialties were formed at the hospital including neurosurgery, by Harvey Cushing and Walter Dandy; cardiac surgery by Alfred Blalock; and child psychiatry, by Leo Kanner. Attached to the hospital is the Johns Hopkins Children’s Center which serves infants, children, teens, and young adults aged 0–21.

Johns Hopkins Hospital is widely regarded as one of the world's greatest hospitals and medical institutions. It was ranked by U.S. News & World Report news magazine as the best overall hospital in America for 21 consecutive years (1991–2011). In 2019–2020, U.S. News & World Report ranked the hospital on 15 adult specialties and 10 children's specialties; the hospital came in 1st in Maryland and 3rd nationally behind the Mayo Clinic in Rochester, Minnesota and Mass General in Boston, Massachusetts. In 2021 the hospital marked 32 consecutive years of placing in the top 5 hospitals in the nation.

Beginnings

Johns Hopkins, (1795–1873), a Baltimore merchant and banker, left an estate of approximately $7 million (US$173.84 million in 2022) when he died on Christmas Eve, December 24, 1873, in his city mansion on West Saratoga Street, just west of North Charles Street, at the age of 78. In his will, he asked that his fortune be used to found two institutions that would bear his name: "Johns Hopkins University" and "The Johns Hopkins Hospital." At the time that it was made, Hopkins's gift was the largest philanthropic bequest in the history of the United States.

Toward the end of his life, Hopkins selected 12 prominent Baltimoreans to be the trustees for the project and a year before his death, sent a letter telling them that he was giving "thirteen acres of land, situated in the city of Baltimore, and bounded by Broadway, Wolfe, Monument, and Jefferson streets upon which I desire you to erect a hospital." He wished for a hospital "which shall, in construction and arrangement, compare favorably with any other institution of like character in this country or in Europe" and directed his trustees to "secure for the service of the Hospital, physicians and surgeons of the highest character and greatest skill."

Most importantly, Hopkins told the trustees to "bear constantly in mind that it is my wish and purpose that the hospital shall ultimately form a part of the Medical School of that university for which I have made ample provision in my will."  By calling for this integral relationship between patient care, as embodied in the hospital, and teaching and research, as embodied in the university, Hopkins laid the groundwork for a revolution in American medicine. Johns Hopkins' vision, of two institutions in which the practice of medicine would be wedded to medical research and medical education was nothing short of revolutionary.

Initial plans for the hospital were drafted by surgeon John Shaw Billings, and the architecture designed by John Rudolph Niernsee and completed by Edward Clarke Cabot of the Boston firm of Cabot and Chandler in a Queen Anne style. When completed in 1889 at a cost of $2,050,000 (US$50.8 million in 2022), the hospital included what was then state-of-the-art concepts in heating and ventilation to check the spread of disease.

The trustees obtained the services of four outstanding physicians, known as the "Big Four," to serve as the founding staff of the hospital when it opened on May 7, 1889. They were pathologist William Henry Welch, surgeon William Stewart Halsted, internist William Osler, and gynecologist Howard Atwood Kelly.

In 1893, Johns Hopkins University was one of the first medical schools to admit women. The decision to begin coeducation was a result of a shortage of funds, as the B&O Railroad stock that was supposed to cover cost was used up in building the hospital in 1889 and the medical school had not yet been built. Four of the original trustees’ daughters offered to raise the money needed to open the school, but only if the school agreed to admit qualified women to the university. After several discussions, the trustees agreed to their terms and accepted the financial help of these four women, with only one of the doctors, William Henry Welch resisting. Eventually, even Welch changed his views on coeducation, "The necessity for coeducation in some form," he wrote later, "becomes more evident the higher the character of the education. In no form of education is this more evident than in that of medicine ... we regard coeducation a success; those of us who were not enthusiastic at the beginning are now sympathetic and friendly."

Osler, the first chief of the Department of Medicine, is credited with originating the idea of a residency, whereby recently graduated doctors receive advanced training in their specialty while treating patients under supervision; then as now, residents comprise most of the medical staff of the hospital. He also introduced the idea of bringing medical students into actual patient care early in their training; at the time medical school consisted almost entirely of lectures. Osler's contribution to practical education extends to the creation of "grand rounds", the practice of leading physicians discussing the most difficult cases in front of assembled medical students, for the benefit of patients and students. The term “rounds” derives from the circular ward where bedside teaching occurred. He once said he hoped his tombstone would say only, "He brought medical students into the wards for bedside teaching."

Halsted, the first chief of the Department of Surgery, established many other medical and surgical achievements at Johns Hopkins including modern surgical principles of control of bleeding, accurate anatomical dissection, complete sterility, and the first radical mastectomy for breast cancer (before this time, such a diagnosis was a virtual death sentence). His other achievements included the introduction of the surgical glove and advances in thyroid, biliary tree, hernia, intestinal and arterial aneurysm surgeries. Halsted also established the first formal surgical residency training program in the United States.

Kelly is credited with establishing gynecology as a true medical specialty. He created new surgical approaches to women's diseases and invented numerous medical devices, including a urinary cystoscope. He was one of the first to use radium to treat cancer.

Welch was responsible for training many of the outstanding physicians of the day, such as Walter Reed. He also founded at Hopkins the nation's first Public Health school, now known as the Johns Hopkins Bloomberg School of Public Health.

A familiar sight at the hospital is the marble statue Christus Consolator (or "Christ, The Divine Healer") in the rotunda of the Billings Administration Building.The gift of a Baltimore merchant, William Wallace Spence, it is a replica of the original by Danish sculptor Bertel Thorwaldsen in Copenhagen, Denmark. Unveiled in 1896, it brings comfort to many, the hospital has said.

In 1903, Harriet Lane Johnston left a sum of over $400,000 at her death in 1903 to establish the Harriet Lane Home for Invalid Children as a memorial to two sons who had died in childhood. In October 1912 the Harriet Lane Home officially opened. It was the first children's clinic in the United States that was associated with a medical school, first run by John Howland. Eventually treating over 60,000 children a year, the Harriet Lane Home became a pioneer treatment, teaching, and research clinic, and the first to have subspecialties in pediatrics as created by Edwards A. Park. From 1930 to 1963 Helen Taussig, who helped to develop the blue baby operation, headed the pediatric cardiac clinic. Child psychiatrist Leo Kanner did studies of autistic children. Lawson Wilkins established an endocrine clinic that developed procedures used universally to treat children with certain glandular disorders, including dwarfism. John E. Bordley and William G. Hardy made strides in detecting hearing impairments in very young children.

In 1912, Diamond Jim Brady donated $220,000 to the hospital, which created the James Buchanan Brady Urological Institute.

Ophthalmologist William Holland Wilmer opened the Wilmer Eye Institute in 1925, its home was completed four years later. Wilmer received an M.D. degree from the University of Virginia in 1885 and worked in New York, Washington D.C., in addition to Baltimore, where he established the institute.

Achievements
Medical achievements at Johns Hopkins include the first male-to-female sex reassignment surgery in the United States that took place in 1966 at the Hopkins Gender Identity Clinic. Two of the most far-reaching advances in medicine during the last 25 years were also made at Hopkins. First, the Nobel Prize-winning discovery of restriction enzymes gave birth to the genetic engineering industry. Second, the discovery of the brain's natural opiates has triggered an explosion of interest in neurotransmitter pathways and functions. Other accomplishments include the development of HeLa, by George Otto Gey, head of tissue culture research in 1951; the first and arguably most important line of human cells grown in culture; identification of the three types of polio virus; and the first "blue baby" operation, which was done by surgeon Alfred Blalock in collaboration with Helen Taussig, a female Hopkins graduate specializing in pediatric cardiology and surgical technician Vivien Thomas which opened the way to modern heart surgery. Contributions to heart surgery were brought on by the discovery of heparin and the Blalock-Thomas-Taussig Shunt. Johns Hopkins has also published The Harriet Lane Handbook, an indispensable tool for pediatricians, for over 60 years.

Operations

The hospital occupies approximately 20 of the 60 buildings on the Johns Hopkins Medical Campus.  The complex has over 80 entrances and receives 80,000 visitors weekly. It houses over 1,000 beds and has a staff of over 1,700 doctors with over 30,000 total employees.
From 1982 to 1992, then CEO Robert Heyssel established the hospital's first Oncology Center, the Nelson Patient Tower, the Clayton Heart Center and the Johns Hopkins Outpatient Center which bears Heyssel's name. In May 2012, the Johns Hopkins Hospital opened two new towers as part of a major campus redevelopment effort. The opening of the new $1.1 billion Charlotte R. Bloomberg Children's Center tower and the new Sheikh Zayed Tower marked the highpoint of this effort. In addition to the main hospital, the system operates four other hospitals and several outpatient care facilities in the Baltimore and Washington metro areas and All Children's Hospital in St. Petersburg, Florida. In May, 2019, the hospital completed an $80 million expansion project at its Green Spring Station campus in Brooklandville, Maryland, offering out-patient surgery, imaging, and oncology treatment at the 3-story,  Pavilion III.
Johns Hopkins also provides remote consultations worldwide through the Grand Rounds platform, and uses the same platform to help patients find the ideal specialist for their unique needs.

Johns Hopkins Children’s Center 

Johns Hopkins Children’s Center (JHCC) is a nationally ranked, pediatric acute care children's teaching hospital located in Baltimore, Maryland, adjacent to Johns Hopkins Hospital. The hospital has 196 pediatric beds and is affiliated the Johns Hopkins School of Medicine. The hospital is the flagship pediatric member of Johns Hopkins Medicine and is 1 of 2 children's hospital in the network. The hospital provides comprehensive pediatric specialties and subspecialties to infants, children, teens, and young adults aged 0–21 throughout Baltimore and the wider United States. Johns Hopkins Children’s Center also sometimes treats adults that require pediatric care. Johns Hopkins Children’s Center also features one of the only ACS verified Level 1 Pediatric Trauma Centers in the state. The hospital is directly attached to Johns Hopkins Hospital and is situated near the Ronald McDonald House of Maryland.

Rankings
The Johns Hopkins Hospital was ranked as the top overall hospital in the United States for 21 consecutive years by U.S. News & World Report until 2012, when it moved to 2nd place behind the rise of the Massachusetts General Hospital. In 2013, it was reinstated as the top hospital in the United States. In the 2016-2017 Best Hospitals edition, Johns Hopkins ranks 3rd nationally.

Controversy
On February 5, 2013, it was discovered that a male gynecologist had been taking voyeuristic photographs of his patients in compromising and embarrassing situations. He took pictures with special camera-equipped pens, key fobs and other recording devices. The number of victims was about 8,000 - 9,000. He was fired on February 8, 2013, and committed suicide 10 days later. On July 21, 2014, Johns Hopkins Hospital agreed to pay a $190 million settlement; it was reported to be the largest settlement in U.S. history involving sexual misconduct by a physician.

See also

 Johns Hopkins All Children's Hospital
 Johns Hopkins School of Medicine
 Johns Hopkins University
 Hopkins television series
 Medical centers in the United States

References

Further reading

External links

 The Johns Hopkins Hospital and Health System website
 Johns Hopkins Medicine website
 Baltimore, Maryland, a National Park Service Discover Our Shared Heritage Travel Itinerary
 Johns Hopkins Hospital on Google Street View
 C-SPAN Q&A interview with Ronald Peterson about Johns Hopkins Hospital, January 9, 2005

 
Teaching hospitals in Maryland
Johns Hopkins Medical Institutions
Johns Hopkins University
Hospitals in Baltimore
Hospital buildings on the National Register of Historic Places in Baltimore
Hospital buildings completed in 1889
Hospitals established in 1889
Voluntary hospitals
1889 establishments in Maryland